Blanca Alcalá Ruiz (born 8 October 1961 in Tlaxcala City) is a Mexican politician. From 2008 to 2011, she served as the mayor of Puebla, the capital city of the State of Puebla. She was the first female mayor in the history of the city. In August 2017 she was named Ambassador to Colombia.

Education
 Bachelor's in International Relations from Universidad de las Américas Puebla (UDLAP)
 Master's in Public Administration from Instituto de Administración Pública, Veracruz
 PhD candidate in Public Administration from Instituto de Administración Pública, Veracruz

Political career

 Mexican Ambassador to Colombia
 Senator of the Republic LXII and LXIII legislature
 Mayor of Puebla Period 2008-2011 (First woman elected)
 Head of Ministry of Finance of 1998–1999. (First woman)
 General Delegate of the National Bank of Public Works and Services.
 Regional Development Deputy Secretary of Social Development.
 Secretary of Social Development
 Director of Foreign Trade and Foreign Investment of the Ministry of Economy of Puebla Government 1993–1995.
 Undersecretary of SEDECAP
 General Director of the State for Family Development.
 General Director of the Institute of Women at Puebla.
 President of the Southern Region of the National Federation of Municipalities of Mexico (FENAMM).
 President of the Mexican Association of World Heritage Cities 2009.
 Local Representative of H. LIII Legislature State Congress.
 CEN Deputy PRI in the state of Colima.
 Deputy General Secretary of the CNOP CEN.
 Secretary General of the State Executive Committee of the PRI.
 President of Municipal Committee of PRI in Puebla.
 Member of the Political Council and Municipal State. Undersecretary of State Steering Committee Organization. PRI
 Deputy Director of the Center for Political, Economic and Social. 
 Delegate District and Municipal Police.
 Director of the National Association of Revolutionary Women Organization (ANFER).
 Active member of the Institutional Revolutionary Party since 1981.

Supercentenarian relative

References

External links
 https://translate.google.com/translate?hl=en&sl=es&u=http://m.aquiespuebla.com/noticias/puebla/9384-puebla-blanca-alcala&prev=/search%3Fq%3DBlanca%2BAlcal%25C3%25A1%2Bmayor%2Bof%2Bpuebla%26start%3D10%26sa%3DN%26espv%3D210%26es_sm%3D93%26biw%3D1366%26bih%3D667

Living people
1961 births
Municipal presidents in Puebla
Institutional Revolutionary Party politicians
Women mayors of places in Mexico
21st-century Mexican politicians
21st-century Mexican women politicians
Politicians from Tlaxcala
People from Tlaxcala City
Universidad de las Américas Puebla alumni
Members of the Congress of Puebla
20th-century Mexican politicians
20th-century Mexican women politicians
Members of the Senate of the Republic (Mexico) for Puebla
Members of the Latin American Parliament
Women members of the Senate of the Republic (Mexico)